United Nations Security Council resolution 769, adopted unanimously on 7 August 1992, after reaffirming Resolution 743 (1992) and all subsequent resolutions relating to the United Nations Protection Force (UNPROFOR), the Council authorised enlargements in the strength and mandate of UNPROFOR to "enable the Force to control the entry of civilians into the United Nations Protected Areas", in addition to performing immigration and customs functions.

The Council demanded co-operation with the Force and also condemned abuses committed against the civilian population, particularly on ethnic grounds.

See also
 Breakup of Yugoslavia
 Bosnian War
 Croatian War of Independence
 List of United Nations Security Council Resolutions 701 to 800 (1991–1993)
 Slovenian Independence War
 Yugoslav Wars

References

External links
 
Text of the Resolution at undocs.org

 0769
 0769
1992 in Yugoslavia
1992 in Bosnia and Herzegovina
1992 in Croatia
 0769
August 1992 events